Associazione Calcistica Perugia Calcio, or simply Perugia, is a professional football club based in Perugia, Umbria, Italy, that competes in the .

Founded in 1905 as Associazione Calcistica Perugia, the club folded in 2005 and were re-founded the same year as Perugia Calcio, before dissolving once again in 2010, taking on its current name.

The club has played 13 times in the Serie A; their best placement was finishing runners-up in 1978–79 year unbeaten, becoming the first team under the round-robin format to finish the Serie A season without defeats. In addition to various minor league titles, the club has won the 2003 UEFA Intertoto Cup, and has made two UEFA Cup appearances. In its Serie A spell under club president Luciano Gaucci around the turn of the century Perugia had some upset wins at home, most notably against Juventus on the final day in 2000, which lead to their opponents dropping the title win to Lazio. Gaucci's era ended with relegation in 2004 after which bankruptcy unfolded.

The club's players are nicknamed "biancorossi" (red and whites) due to their historical kit colours, which include red shirts and socks accompanied by white shorts, and "grifoni" (griffins), inspired by their city's heraldic symbol. They play their home matches at the 28,000-capacity Stadio Renato Curi. In the 1979–80 season, they became the first Italian football team to show a kit sponsorship.

History

A.C. Perugia (1905–2004) 
A.C. Perugia were founded on 9 June 1905, after the merger of U.S. Fortebraccio and Libertas.

Promotion to Serie B in 1966 would mark the beginning of one of the club's most successful periods. Perugia spent the next eight years in Serie B before promotion to Serie A for the first time in 1975.

In the club's first Serie A season, Perugia finished eighth with 31 points – just short of a European place. Star players in the side included defender Pierluigi Frosio and midfielders Renato Curi and Franco Vannini. The side remained in the top half of the table for the rest of the decade, finishing runners-up in 1979 with 11 wins and 19 draws, resulting in the only unbeaten side not to win a title. However, tragedy and scandal marred this period. In 1977, Curi died of a heart attack during a league match with Juventus, while Vannini's career was ended by injury in 1979. The Totonero scandal in 1980 led to a 5-point penalty and relegation in 1981. Ilario Castagner was coach during this period.

The club spent the first half of the 1980s trying to get back to Serie A, nearly succeeding in 1984–85. Another scandal in 1986 forced Perugia down to Serie C2. It was during this time that Fabrizio Ravanelli would be discovered, he would later go on to a career with Reggiana, Juventus, Middlesbrough and several other clubs before returning to Perugia.

The controversial and eccentric Luciano Gaucci took control of the club. The side returned to Serie B in 1994 and under the guidance of Giovanni Galeone reached Serie A in 1996. Perugia started well before Gaucci's decision to replace Galeone with Nevio Scala. The side's form subsequently declined before a late rally gave them a chance of survival- a 2–1 defeat at Piacenza in the final round sealed their fate. With Castagner back in charge, Perugia won a play-off with Torino to secure a return to the top flight.

The next six seasons saw Perugia hold their own in Serie A with foreign imports including the Japanese international Hidetoshi Nakata in 1998. The team came under scrutiny when Gaucci criticised and eventually terminated the contract of his own player, Ahn Jung-Hwan of South Korea, for scoring the golden goal that knocked Italy out of the 2002 FIFA World Cup, and allegedly insulting the Italian nation. Ahn's national manager Guus Hiddink spoke out against the sacking. Following the outcry, it however transpired that Ahn was only ever on a season-long contract and by the time of the World
Cup, was no longer under contract to Perugia and the "sacking" was all a publicity stunt by Gaucci.

In the summer of 2003, Perugia signed English striker Jay Bothroyd, and Al-Saadi Gaddafi (the son of Libyan dictator Muammar Gaddafi). Soon after, the club were one of three winners of the 2003 UEFA Intertoto Cup after beating VfL Wolfsburg of Germany 3–0 on aggregate. This qualified the team to the 2003–04 UEFA Cup, in which they were eliminated in the third round by PSV Eindhoven.

Perugia Calcio (2005–2010) 
The new chairman Vincenzo Silvestrini had re-established the club in 2005 as Perugia Calcio.

After a takeover, in 2009 Perugia Calcio property passed to Perugian entrepreneur and former Pisa owner and chairman Leonardo Covarelli. On 21 May 2010 the Court of Perugia declared the bankruptcy of Perugia Calcio srl. Nobody decided to take over the society at the subsequent auction and on 30 June 2010 the club was unable to join the Italian third level championship 2010–2011. The Italian Football Federation decided on 8 July 2010 to revoke the affiliation of the bankrupt Perugia Calcio Srl.

From A.S.D. Perugia Calcio to A.C. Perugia Calcio (2010–present) 

During the summer break 2010, this new club with the same denomination and inheriting the old side history, was entered into the Serie D Girone E.

On 10 April 2011, Perugia became the first team of the season to get promoted from Serie D to the Lega Pro Seconda Divisione 2011–12, after a 3–2 home victory against Castel Rigone. They eventually won the Girone E. The club also won the 2010–11 Coppa Italia Serie D, beating Turris 1–0 in the final.

In summer 2011 the club was renamed Associazione Calcistica Perugia Calcio, thus becoming a professional company, to play in the Lega Pro Seconda Divisione/B obtaining immediate promotion to Lega Pro Prima Divisione. On 4 May 2014, beating Frosinone 1–0, A.C. Perugia won the 2013–14 Lega Pro Prima Divisione championship and gained promotion to Serie B after a 9-year absence from Italy's second highest football division.

On 2 May 2021, Perugia finished in first place in group B of the 2020–21 Serie C, and were promoted back to the Serie B. Their promotion came after consecutive wins in the last five games on the season, having been in third place, six points from first place.

Players

Current squad

Other players under contract

Out on loan

Coaching staff

Honours

League
Serie B:
Winner: 1974-75
Serie C1:
Winner:  1932-33, 1945-46, 1966-67, 1993-94, 2013-14, 2020-21
Serie C2:
Winner:   1987-88, 2011-12,
Serie D:
Winner:  2010-11,

Cups
Supercoppa di Lega Pro:
Winner: 2014
Supercoppa di Serie C2:
Winner: 2012
Coppa Italia Serie D:
Winner: 2010–11

European
UEFA Intertoto Cup:
Winner:  2003,

Divisional movements

Records
Serie A:
Runners-up and unbeaten: 1978–79

European record

UEFA Cup

UEFA Intertoto Cup

References

External links

 

 
Football clubs in Italy
Football clubs in Umbria
Association football clubs established in 1905
Serie B clubs
1905 establishments in Italy
Phoenix clubs (association football)
P